San Marino competed at the 1988 Summer Olympics in Seoul, South Korea.

Competitors
The following is the list of number of competitors in the Games.

Results by event

Swimming
Men's 50m Freestyle
 Michele Piva
 Heat – 26.60 (→ did not advance, 63rd place)
 Filippo Piva
 Heat – 26.96 (→ did not advance, 66th place)

Men's 100m Freestyle
 Michele Piva
 Heat – 57.99 (→ did not advance, 69th place)
 Filippo Piva
 Heat – 58.39 (→ did not advance, 71st place)

Men's 100m Backstroke
 Filippo Piva
 Heat – 1:07.63 (→ did not advance, 48th place)

Men's 100m Breaststroke
 Michele Piva
 Heat – 1:13.94 (→ did not advance, 56th place)

References

Official Olympic Reports

Nations at the 1988 Summer Olympics
1988
Summer Olympics